Guan Ping (died January or February 220) was a military general serving under the warlord Liu Bei during the late Eastern Han dynasty of China.

Life
Guan Ping was the eldest son of Guan Yu. Little about him is documented in historical records except that he was captured along with his father west of Maicheng (麦城, southeast of present-day Dangyang, Hubei) by the forces of Sun Quan sometime between 23 January and 21 February 220. They were executed in Linju (臨沮; in present-day Nanzhang County, Xiangyang, Hubei) later.

In Romance of the Three Kingdoms
Guan Ping appears in the 14th century historical novel Romance of the Three Kingdoms by Luo Guanzhong. He is the second son of Guan Ding (關定), a farmer. His elder brother is Guan Ning (關寧). Guan Yu encounters Guan Ding and his family during his journey across five passes to find Liu Bei. He is so impressed with Guan Ping on first sight that he accepts him as his foster son. During the Battle of Runan, Guan Ping, Guan Yu and Zhou Cang lead 300 men to rescue Liu Bei, who is under attack by Cao Cao's general Zhang He. Guan Ping participates in some of Liu Bei's subsequent military exploits, including the Battle of Bowang against Cao Cao's general Xiahou Dun, and the Yi Province campaign against Liu Zhang. Later, he is relocated to Jing Province to join his foster father in defending Liu Bei's territories in Jing Province. In 219, Guan Ping follows Guan Yu to the Battle of Fancheng and scores some initial victories over Cao Cao's forces, including flooding seven enemy armies. However, in the meantime, Sun Quan (Liu Bei's ally) secretly breaks the alliance and sends his general Lü Meng to attack and conquer Jing Province in a stealth invasion. Guan Yu is completely caught off guard and eventually isolated in Maicheng with a fraction of his remaining forces. While trying to break out of the siege, Guan Yu and Guan Ping are captured in an ambush by Sun Quan's forces. Sun Quan tries to persuade them to surrender, but they refuse so Sun has them executed.

In popular culture

Religion

Guan Ping sometimes appears as a door god in Chinese and Taoist temples in partnership with Guan Yu. He also sometimes accompanies Guan Yu in his role as a war god, sometimes in combination with Zhou Cang and Liao Hua. Guan Ping's face is traditionally painted white, while Zhou Cang is black and Guan Yu red.

Video games
Guan Ping appears as a playable character in Koei's Dynasty Warriors and Warriors Orochi video game series.

See also
 Lists of people of the Three Kingdoms

Notes

References

Citations

Bibliography
 Chen, Shou (3rd century). Records of the Three Kingdoms (Sanguozhi).
 Luo, Guanzhong (14th century). Romance of the Three Kingdoms (Sanguo Yanyi).

Year of birth unknown
3rd-century executions
220 deaths
Guan Yu
Generals under Liu Bei
Executed Han dynasty people
People executed by the Han dynasty by decapitation
Chinese gods
Deified Chinese people